Uruguay has issued revenue stamps since 1871. Uses have included documentary taxes, consular services and tobacco and alcohol duties.

First revenues
The first revenue stamps issued by Uruguay were the 1871 documentary series showing the national arms. Five values were issued from 20c to 3p.

See also 
Postage stamps and postal history of Uruguay
Taxation in Uruguay

References

Further reading
Catalogues by Alfred Forbin.
Ross, Joe. (2005) The revenue stamps of Uruguay Patente de Rodados de Departamento de Montevideo Vehicle Registration Department of Montevideo 1928-1963. Elverta, California: Joe Ross.

External links
Revenues - Tracción a Sangre - Pulled by Blood by Joe Ross

Economy of Uruguay
Philately of Uruguay
Uruguay